The Admiralty Naval Staff was the former senior command, operational planning, policy and strategy department within the British Admiralty. It was established in 1917 and existed until 1964 when the department of the Admiralty was abolished. It was replaced by the Ministry of Defence (Naval Staff) as part of the Ministry of Defence Navy Department.

History and development
In December 1916 Admiral Sir John Jellicoe was appointed Admiral of the Fleet and First Sea Lord he would oversee the expansion of the Naval Staff at the Admiralty and the introduction of convoys,  In April, 1917 the Admiralty War Staff function was abolished and replaced by a new Admiralty Naval Staff department and Jellicoe was also given the additional title of Chief of the Naval Staff he was assisted initially by two deputies, the Deputy Chief of the Naval Staff and the Assistant Chief of the Naval Staff, these would be joined later by the Deputy First Sea Lord and Vice Chief of the Naval Staff, Jellicoe was relieved at the end of 1917. Changes in the structure of the Staff were implemented from 1918 onward during the interwar period some of the divisions were wound down in peace time but would be re-established with the advent of the Second World War. After the war the divisions were once again downsized.

Duties
The term 'Naval Staff' does not mean all Naval Officers serving in the former Admiralty Department, it means the divisions that are responsible under the Office of the Chief of Naval Staff and including his deputy, vice and assistant chiefs of the staff for the formulation of naval strategy including strategic planning, conduct of operations, implementation of naval policy, application of tactical doctrines, the collection and dissemination of intelligence and for stating the broad naval requirements, including the quantities and specification of ships, naval aircraft, armament and equipment the Naval Staff also included some civilian members.

Admiralty departments
The admiralty divisions should be not confused with its departments which were distinct and separate from the function of the naval staff in that they were superintended by the offices of the various Sea Lords responsible for them and were primarily administrative and logistical support bodies.

Members of the naval staff
Board of Admiralty member (*)
 First Sea Lord and Chief of the Naval Staff *
 Deputy First Sea Lord *
 Deputy Chief of the Naval Staff *
 Vice Chief of the Naval Staff *
 Assistant Chief of the Naval Staff *
 Assistant Chief of the Naval Staff (Air)
 Assistant Chief of the Naval Staff (Foreign)
 Assistant Chief of the Naval Staff (Home)
 Assistant Chief of the Naval Staff (Operations)
 Assistant Chief of the Naval Staff (Policy) 
 Assistant Chief of Naval Staff (Submarines)
 Assistant Chief of the Naval Staff
 Assistant Chief of the Naval Staff (Warfare)
 Assistant Chief of the Naval Staff (U boat and Trade)
 Assistant Chief of the Naval Staff (Weapons)

Structure of the naval staff

May 1917
The Naval Staff was organised by Admiral of the Fleet Sir John Jellicoe as follows:

 First Sea Lord and Chief of Naval Staff 
 Deputy Chief of the Naval Staff 
Intelligence Division
Mobilisation Division
Operations Division
Signal Division
 Assistant Chief of the Naval Staff
Anti-Submarine Division
Convoy Section
Minesweeping Division
Trade Division

June 1917
The Naval Staff was organised as follows:

 First Sea Lord and Chief of Naval Staff
 Deputy Chief of the Naval Staff
Intelligence Division
Mobilisation Division
Operations Division
Signal Division
 Assistant Chief of the Naval Staff
Anti-Submarine Division
Minesweeping Division
Trade Division

December 1917
The Naval Staff was organised as follows:

 First Sea Lord and Chief of Naval Staff
 Deputy Chief of the Naval Staff
Operations Division
Plans Division
Signal Division
 Assistant Chief of the Naval Staff
Anti-Submarine Division
Mercantile Movements Division
Minesweeping Division
Mobilisation Division
Trade Division
 Deputy First Sea Lord
Training Division

1918 to 1919
The Naval Staff was re-organised under Admiral of the Fleet Sir Rosslyn Wemyss as follows:

 First Sea Lord and Chief of Naval Staff
Intelligence Division
Gunnery and Torpedo Division
Training and Staff Duties Division
 Deputy Chief of the Naval Staff (Home Waters Operations)
Air Division
Operations Division (Home)
Plans Division
Signal Division
 Assistant Chief of the Naval Staff (Trade Protection Operations)
Anti-Submarine Division
Mercantile Movements Division
Minesweeping Division
Trade Division
 Deputy First Sea Lord (Policy and Overseas Operations)
Operations Division (Foreign)

1920
The Naval Staff was re-organised under Admiral of the Fleet Sir David Beatty, as follows:

 First Sea Lord and Chief of Naval Staff
Intelligence Division
Gunnery and Torpedo Division
Training and Staff Duties Division
 Deputy Chief of the Naval Staff (Home Waters)
Air Division
Operations Division (Home)
Plans Division
Local Defence Division
 Assistant Chief of the Naval Staff (Trade Protection)
Anti-Submarine Division
Mercantile Movements Division
Minesweeping Division
Trade Division
 Deputy First Sea Lord (Policy and Overseas)
Operations Division (Foreign)

1921 to 1926
The Naval Staff was re-organised during the early inter-war years, and the post Deputy First Sea Lord is abolished:
 First Sea Lord and Chief of Naval Staff
Intelligence Division
Gunnery Division
Torpedo Division
Training and Staff Duties Division
 Deputy Chief of the Naval Staff
Communications Division
Operations Division
Plans Division
 Assistant Chief of the Naval Staff 
Air Division
Trade Division
Local Defence Division

1927 to 1929
Admiral of the Fleet Sir Charles Madden re-structured the Naval Staff as follows:

 First Sea Lord and Chief of Naval Staff
 Deputy Chief of the Naval Staff
Intelligence Division 
Operations Division
Plans Division (including local defence)
Trade Division
 Assistant Chief of the Naval Staff 
Air Division
Gunnery Division
Tactical Division
Torpedo Division
Training and Staff Duties Division

1932
Admiral of the Fleet Sir Frederick Field organised the Naval Staff as follows:

 First Sea Lord and Chief of Naval Staff
 Deputy Chief of the Naval Staff (Policy)
Air Division
Intelligence Division 
Operations Division
Plans Division
Tactical Division
Trade Division
Training and Staff Duties Division

1935
Admiral of the Fleet Sir Ernle Chatfield kept the Naval Staff as follows:

 First Sea Lord and Chief of Naval Staff
 Deputy Chief of the Naval Staff (Policy)
Assistant Chief of the Naval Staff
Air Division
Intelligence Division 
Operations Division
Plans Division
Tactical Division
Trade Division
Training and Staff Duties Division

1941
Admiral of the Fleet Sir Dudley Pound re-organised, the Naval Staff as follows:

 First Sea Lord and Chief of Naval Staff
 Vice Chief of the Naval Staff
Intelligence Division 
Plans Division
Signals Division
 Assistant Chief of the Naval Staff (Home)
Anti-Submarine and Warfare Division
Local Defence Division
Operations Division (Home) 
Operations Division (Mining)
Training and Staff Duties Division
 Assistant Chief of the Naval Staff (Foreign)
Gunnery Division (Foreign)
Operations Division (Foreign) 
Economic Warfare Division
 Assistant Chief of the Naval Staff (U boat and Trade)
Minesweeping Division
Trade Division

1945
Admiral of the Fleet Sir Andrew Cunninghamre-organised the Naval Staff, as follows:

 First Sea Lord and Chief of Naval Staff
Deputy First Sea Lord (Policy)
 Vice Chief of the Naval Staff
Intelligence Division 
Plans Division
Plans Division (Q)
Signals Division
 Assistant Chief of the Naval Staff (Home)
Anti-U Boat Division
Local Defence Division
Operations Division (Home) 
Operations Division (Mining)
Training and Staff Duties Division
 Assistant Chief of the Naval Staff (Foreign)
Operations Division (Foreign) 
Economic Warfare Division
 Assistant Chief of the Naval Staff (Weapons)
Gunnery Division
 Assistant Chief of the Naval Staff (U Boat and Trade)
Minesweeping Division
Trade Division

1951
Admiral of the Fleet Sir Bruce Fraser re-organised the Naval Staff, as follows:

 First Sea Lord and Chief of Naval Staff
 Vice Chief of the Naval Staff
 Deputy Chief of the Naval Staff
Assistant Chief of the Naval Staff
Naval Air Organisation and Training Division 
Intelligence Division 
Operations Division
Plans Division
Plans Division (Q)
Standardisation Division
Tactical and Staff Duties Division
Trade Division
Assistant Chief of the Naval Staff, Warfare
Gunnery and Anti-Aircraft Warfare Division
Naval Air Warfare Division
Torpedo, Anti-Submarine and Minewarfare Division

1956
Admiral of the Fleet Earl, Louis Mountbatten, re-organised the Naval Staff, as follows:

 First Sea Lord and Chief of Naval Staff
 Vice Chief of the Naval Staff
 Deputy Chief of the Naval Staff
Assistant Chief of the Naval Staff
Administrative Planning Department
Naval Air Organisation and Training Division  
Naval Intelligence Division 
Operations Division
Plans Division
Assistant Chief of the Naval Staff, Warfare
Gunnery Division
Naval Air Warfare Division
Signal Division
Tactical Ship Requirements and Staff Duties Division
Trade Division
Under-surface Warfare Division

1958
Admiral of the Fleet Earl, Louis Mountbatten, re-organised the Naval Staff, as follows:

 First Sea Lord and Chief of Naval Staff
 Vice Chief of the Naval Staff
 Deputy Chief of the Naval Staff
Assistant Chief of the Naval Staff
Administrative Planning Department
Naval Air Organisation and Training Division 
Naval Intelligence Division 
Operations Division
Plans Division
Assistant Chief of the Naval Staff, Warfare
Navigation and Direction Division
Signal Division
Tactical Ship Requirements and Staff Duties Division
Trade Division
Under-surface Warfare Division

1962
Admiral of the Fleet Sir Caspar John, First Sea Lord and Chief of Naval Staff re-organised the Naval Staff, as follows:

 First Sea Lord and Chief of Naval Staff
 Vice Chief of the Naval Staff
 Deputy Chief of the Naval Staff
Assistant Chief of the Naval Staff
Administrative Planning Division
Naval Intelligence Division 
Plans Division
Tactical and Weapons Policy Division
Assistant Chief of the Naval Staff, Warfare
Gunnery Division
Naval Air Division
Navigation and Direction Division
Signal Division
Trade and Operations Division
Under-surface Warfare Division

1964
Admiral Sir David Luce as First Sea Lord and Chief of Naval Staff organised the Naval Staff in July 1964 as follows:

 First Sea Lord and Chief of Naval Staff
 Deputy Chief of the Naval Staff 
 Assistant Chief of the Naval Staff
Gunnery Division
Naval Air Division
Navigation and Direction Division
Plans Division
Signal Division
Tactical and Weapons Policy Division
Trade and Operations Division
Under-surface Warfare Division

Post 1964
Following the merger within the Ministry of Defence until 1971 former naval staff divisions were renamed as directorates as well as new ones being established for specific purposes some other notable changes during this period included the commandant general, and the hydrographer of the navy now as part of the naval staff as follows:

 Defence Intelligence – (former naval intelligence division)
 Directorate of Naval Plans – (former plans division)
 Directorate of Defence Plans (Navy) – (new directorate as part of MOD)
 Directorate of Naval Administrative Planning – (former administrative planning division)
 Directorate of Naval Air Warfare – (former naval air division)
 Directorate of Naval Operations and Trade – (former operations and trade division)
 Directorate of Naval Signals – (former signals division)
 Directorate of Naval Tactical and Weapons Policy – (former tactical and weapons policy division)
 Directorate of Operational Analysis (RN) – (new directorate)
 Directorate of Surface Warfare (Naval) – (new directorate)
 Directorate of Under Sea Warfare (Naval) – (former under sea warfare division)
 Directorate of Navigation and Tactical Control (Naval) – (former navigation and direction division)

See also
Staff (military)

References

Attribution
Primary source for this article is by Harley Simon, Lovell Tony, (2014), Naval Staff (Royal Navy), dreadnoughtproject.org, http://www.dreadnoughtproject.org.

Sources
Black, Nicholas (2009). The British Naval Staff in the First World War. Woodbridge: The Boydell Press. .
"Proposals by Director of Naval Intelligence for carrying out the Duties of a General Staff and Re-organisation of the Naval Intelligence Department."  15 May 1909.  The National Archives.  ADM 1/8047.
Naval Staff, Training and Staff Duties Division (1929). The Naval Staff of the Admiralty. Its Work and Development. B.R. 1845 (late C.B. 3013). Copy at The National Archives. ADM 234/434
 Rodger. N.A.M., (1979) The Admiralty (offices of state), T. Dalton, Lavenham, .
 Smith, Gordon (2014), British Admiralty, Part 2 - Changes in Admiralty Departments 1913-1920, Naval-History.Net.
 Stationery Office, H.M. (1935). The Navy List. Sprink and Sons Ltd, London, England. pp. 414–415.
 Stationery Office, H.M. (1951). The Navy List. Spink and Son Ltd, London, England. pp. 326–327.
 Stationery Office, H.M. (1956). The Navy List. Spink and Son Ltd, London, England. pp. 1239–1241.
 Stationery Office, H.M. (1958). The Navy List. Spink and Son Ltd, London, England. pp. 1227–1229.
 Stationery Office, H.M. (1962). The Navy List. Spink and Son Ltd, London, England. pp. 906–908.

External links
 

Admiralty during World War II
Admiralty departments
A
1917 establishments in the United Kingdom
1964 disestablishments in the United Kingdom
Staff (military)